Ethel Hannah Catherwood (April 28, 1908 – September 26, 1987) was a Canadian athlete.

Born in Hannah, North Dakota, United States, Ethel Catherwood was raised and educated in Saskatoon, Saskatchewan, Canada, where she excelled at baseball, basketball and track and field athletics. In 1926, as a student at Bedford Road Collegiate, she equalled a Canadian record for high jump at the Saskatoon city track and field championships. On Labour Day of the same year, she broke the British-held high jump world record. In 1928, she became a member of the Matchless Six, a group of 6 Canadian women who competed at the 1928 Summer Olympics in Amsterdam, the first Olympics to allow female competitors in athletics. Catherwood took home a gold medal in high jump, clearing . There was considerable focus on her physical attributes during the Games earning her the nickname "Saskatoon Lily". As well, a New York Times correspondent dubbed her the "prettiest girl athlete" at the 1928 Olympics.  However, much more than a pretty face, Ethel Catherwood took home the world's first ever gold medal awarded to a female high jumper and holds the title as the only Canadian female athlete to have won an individual gold medal in an Olympic track and field event.

Catherwood also held national titles in javelin throw, but this event became Olympic only in 1932, whereas she retired from competitions a year earlier. Upon her return from the 1928 Olympics, Catherwood was offered a movie contract, but declined the offer. She took a business course, married, and moved to California.

In 1955, she was inducted into Canada's Sports Hall of Fame, the Saskatchewan Sports Hall of Fame in 1966, and the Saskatoon Sports Hall of Fame in 1986.

Catherwood had an enigmatic life. After the Olympics, where she was feted as the beauty of the games, she was surrounded in scandal. Her secret marriage to and speedy Reno divorce from James McLaren, and later marriage to Byron Mitchell (whom she divorced in 1960) had the press following her every move.  She refused to give interviews.  She even considered trying out for the US Olympic team in 1932. She died in California on September 26, 1987.

Catherwood is the subject of a short graphic (i.e. comic) biography by David Collier entitled "The Ethel Catherwood Story," collected in An Anthology of Graphic Fiction, Cartoons, and True Stories, Ivan Brunetti ed. 2006.

References 

1908 births
1987 deaths
Sportspeople from Haldimand County
Canadian female high jumpers
Olympic gold medalists for Canada
Athletes (track and field) at the 1928 Summer Olympics
People from Cavalier County, North Dakota
Athletes from Saskatoon
Medalists at the 1928 Summer Olympics
Olympic gold medalists in athletics (track and field)
American emigrants to Canada